Raúl Castells (born 1950 in Rosario) is a controversial Argentine political activist. He is the leader of an organization called "Independent Movement for the Retired and Unemployed" (in Spanish, Movimiento Independiente de Jubilados y Desocupados, MIJD), a piquetero group.

Castells moved in 1984 to Santa Fe, where he would spend the next twenty years. He has been detained a number of times under the administration of President Néstor Kirchner; he and his supporters have protested that he is being subject to political persecution. Though Castells has sympathizers in Argentina, many other people disagree with his views.

Castells had a documentary made about him and his movement, called Raúl The Terrible. It was made by Australian political filmmaker David Bradbury and writer/producer, Carlos Alperin. A 'warts-and-all portrait of a man driven to change the world and a frightening insight into the politics of poverty.'In the beginning of March 2006, Castells was given permission to open a community kitchen for poor people at Puerto Madero, the most expensive and wealthy neighbourhood in the city. The site was donated by a business owner in the area who got his permit revoked. The building, offering free food to the poor, is situated opposite the Hilton Hotel and is topped with the words "We are fighting for an Argentina in which the dogs of the rich don't eat better than the children of the poor".

The project has proven controversial, with concerns about the influx of large numbers of impoverished people expressed by some local businessowners.

References

External links
Galloping Films 
MIJD Official Page 
"Raúl, The Terrible" at Filmakers.com

1950 births
Argentine people of Catalan descent
People from Rosario, Santa Fe
Living people
Argentine activists
Candidates for President of Argentina